The Sanhedrin was an assembly of judges.

Sanhedrin may also be:

Books

 Sanhedrin (Talmud), a tractate on criminal law

Events

 Negro Sanhedrin, an assembly of representatives of African-American organizations held in Chicago from Feb. 11–15, 1924
 Grand Sanhedrin, an attempt by Napoleon Bonaparte, Emperor of the French to create a new council with the same legal standing as the original, in 1807